Article 70 of the Constitution of Bangladesh is a controversial clause restricting voting freedom in the Parliament of Bangladesh, written in the country's constitution.

History
Article 70 was written as a result of the Bangladesh Constituent Assembly (Cessation of Membership) Order 1972, promulgated by President Justice Abu Sayeed Chowdhury. The president acted on the advice of Prime Minister Sheikh Mujibur Rahman. The prime minister was upset when a lawmaker from his own party, K. M. Obaidur Rahman, raised a question in the Constituent Assembly of Bangladesh, as to why the assembly had no law making powers. Under the interim constitution in 1972, law making powers resided with the executive branch.

Text
The text of the article is given in the following:-

Implications
The article has the effect of preventing free votes and crossing the floor by Members of Parliament. If MPs vote against their party, they automatically lose their seats. As a result of Article 70, Bangladesh's parliament has largely served as a rubber stamp for actions taken by the ruling party or coalition. The parliament has also not been able to hold a no confidence vote to remove a prime minister.

The provision is contrary to the norms of Westminster systems, as in the parliaments of the United Kingdom, India, Pakistan and Australia; as well as other democratic systems, such as in the U.S. Congress and Japanese Diet.

Critics argue Article 70 contradicts fundamental rights in the constitution, including freedom of speech and freedom of conscience. The lack of accountability in parliament gives unchecked powers to the Prime Minister of Bangladesh, who is often accused of dictatorship. Without the option of a no-confidence motion, the institutional checks and balances on a prime minister's power are significantly limited, as there are few remedies by which a prime minister can be legally dismissed.

Reform
Political scientists, public intellectuals, journalists, civil rights activists and members of parliament have demanded that Article 70 be reformed.

While delivering judgements, the Supreme Court of Bangladesh has opined that Article 70 is undemocratic.

See also
 Parliamentary supremacy

References

Politics of Bangladesh
Constitution of Bangladesh